NASBA may refer to:

Organizations
 National Association of State Boards of Accountancy, a U.S.-based professional association
 National Alliance Of State Broadcasters Associations, a U.S.-based trade association

Science
 Nucleic acid sequence-based amplification, an isothermal amplification method for DNA